Norman van de Vater (born 27 August 1946) is an Irish equestrian. He competed in two events at the 1976 Summer Olympics.

References

1946 births
Living people
Irish male equestrians
Olympic equestrians of Ireland
Equestrians at the 1976 Summer Olympics
Sportspeople from Rhondda Cynon Taf